Rodney Tudor-Cole (born 21 March 1947) is a Zimbabwean sports shooter. He competed in the mixed trap event at the 1988 Summer Olympics.

References

External links
 

1947 births
Living people
Zimbabwean male sport shooters
Olympic shooters of Zimbabwe
Shooters at the 1988 Summer Olympics
Place of birth missing (living people)